Resham Firiri is a traditional Nepali folk song, composed by Buddhi Pariyar and originally performed by Sunder Shrestha and Dwarika Lal Joshi in 1969. Due to sudden rise in popularity, it became one of the most widely known and performed songs in Nepal. It is often played on the sarangi, a native instrument, as street music.

Origin 
Resham Firiri was collected in the villages of Pokhara by Buddhi Pariyar and was recorded in Nepalese radio Radio Nepal. Buddhi Pariyar gave the lyrics to popular Nepalese singers Sunder Shrestha and Dwarika Lal Joshi who were most popular singers then and released in Nepal in 1970 in Nepalese local radios it became a hit song.

Track listing

Instruments 
 Sarangi (violin like Nepali musical instrument)
 Madal (Nepali traditional drum)
 Basuri (Nepali flute)

References

Nepalese songs
Nepali-language songs